Intrauterine epidermal necrosis is a cutaneous condition that is rapidly fatal, characterized by skin erosions and ulcerations only.

See also 
 Congenital erosive and vesicular dermatosis
 List of cutaneous conditions

References 

Cutaneous congenital anomalies